Juhani Ojala (born 19 June 1989) is a Finnish professional footballer who plays as a centre-back for Cypriot First Division club Doxa and the Finland national team. Ojala was born in Vantaa, Finland where he played for the local youth team before moving to HJK's organisation.

Ojala made his international debut for Finland in November 2011, at the age of 22.

Club career

HJK Helsinki
During the 2009 season, Ojala represented mostly Klubi-04, HJK's reserve squad. In the beginning of the 2010 season, however, he was selected to HJK's first eleven, due to various injuries in the squad. His performances were outstanding, and he quickly established himself as one of the key players in HJK's victorious 2010 campaign, playing in all games. Ojala became one of the best and most talented players in the Veikkausliiga, and his performances provoked widespread international interest. At the end of the 2010 Veikkausliiga season, he was officially selected as the defender of the year.

Young Boys
On 9 April 2011 Ojala signed a contract extension with HJK, the new contract running until 2014. But in July, HJK announced that Ojala would transfer to Swiss team BSC Young Boys on 13 August.

He gained notoriety in England during Young Boys' 2012–13 UEFA Europa League group stage match against Liverpool at the Stade de Suisse. In an eventful match, which ended 5–3 to the Reds, Ojala opened the score with an own goal, putting the ball past Marco Wölfli, his own goalkeeper. He later made amends by scoring a header to bring Young Boys level at 2–2 just after half time.

Terek Grozny
After a year and a half in Switzerland on 12 February 2013 it was announced that Ojala would transfer to Russian Premier League team Terek Grozny.

Loan to HJK Helsinki
On 29 July 2015, Ojala rejoined HJK on loan for the remainder of the 2015 Veikkausliiga season. He had a trial with Coventry City F.C. at the end of the season, but was not signed.

SJK
On 1 September 2016, Ojala signed with SJK. He made his debut for SJK on 9 September 2016 playing full 90 minutes in a match against Inter Turku.

Vejle
On 26 August 2019, Danish 1st Division club Vejle Boldklub confirmed, that they had signed Ojala. He reached promotion to the Danish Superliga during his first season at the club, and personally finished with 22 appearances in which he scored two goals.

On 14 September 2020, his debut in the Superliga, he scored in a 4–2 loss to rivals AGF.

Motherwell
On 29 July 2021, Motherwell announced the signing of Ojala on a two-year contract. Ojala left Motherwell by mutual consent on 1 September 2022, having played 24 times for the club.

Doxa Katokopias
On 11 January 2023, Doxa Katokopias announced the signing of Ojala.

International career
In November 2010, after representing Finland on youth levels, Ojala was called up to the national team squad to face San Marino. He made his national team debut on 15 November 2011 in a friendly match against Denmark in Esbjerg when Mixu Paatelainen used him as a substitute. He gained his first FIFA World Cup qualification appearance 12 October 2012 in Helsinki Olympic Stadium in a match against Georgia. During autumn of 2012 he established himself as a regular in the national team. He made his first goal for Finland on 9 January 2017 in a friendly match in Tahnoun bin Mohammed Stadium, Al Ain against Morocco.

Ojala was called up for the UEFA Euro 2020 pre-tournament friendly match against Sweden on 29 May 2021.

Career statistics

Club

International

International goals
Scores and results list Finland's goal tally first.

Honours

Club
HJK Helsinki
Veikkausliiga (2): 2009, 2010

Country
Finland national football team
2012 Baltic Cup Runner-up
2014 Baltic Cup Bronze

Individual
2010: Veikkausliiga defender of the year

References

External links

 Motherwell FC official profile
 Juhani Ojala – SPL competition record  
 
 
 
 
 
 

1989 births
Living people
Finnish footballers
Finland international footballers
Finland youth international footballers
Finland under-21 international footballers
Sportspeople from Vantaa
Association football defenders
Klubi 04 players
Helsingin Jalkapalloklubi players
FC Akhmat Grozny players
BSC Young Boys players
BK Häcken players
Vejle Boldklub players
Veikkausliiga players
Swiss Super League players
Russian Premier League players
Allsvenskan players
Danish 1st Division players
Finnish expatriate footballers
Expatriate footballers in Switzerland
Finnish expatriate sportspeople in Switzerland
Expatriate footballers in Russia
Finnish expatriate sportspeople in Russia
Expatriate footballers in Sweden
Finnish expatriate sportspeople in Sweden
Expatriate men's footballers in Denmark
Finnish expatriate sportspeople in Denmark
Motherwell F.C. players
Scottish Professional Football League players
Expatriate footballers in Scotland
Finnish expatriate sportspeople in Scotland